PSR J0659+1414 is a pulsar. It produces single peaked pulsed gamma rays.

References

Gemini (constellation)
Pulsars